Donoughmore GAA is a Gaelic Athletic Association club, based in the parish of Donoughmore, located in County Cork, Ireland. The club fields both Gaelic football and hurling teams. It is a member of the Muskerry division of Cork GAA.

History
The club was founded in 1884. The club's home is Páirc Eoin Mhic Charthaigh Lackabawn. 
The symbol of the club is the arm of St. Lachteen.

Achievements
 Cork Minor B Football Championship Winner (1) 2007
 Cork Minor C Football Championship Winner (1) 2006
 Cork Minor B Hurling Championship Runner-Up 1993
 Mid Cork Under-21 C Football Championship Winner (1) 2018 
 Cork Under-21 C Football Championship Winners (1) 2018
 Mid Cork Junior A Football Championship Winner (4) 1952, 1983, 1998, 2011 Runner-Up 1953, 1956, 1957, 1962, 1976, 1981, 1982, 1993, 2000
 Mid Cork Junior A Hurling Championship Runner-Up 1933, 1935, 1943, 1952, 2001, 2008, 2013
Mid Cork u14 B1 Championsihps (2) 2018,2019

Notable players
Bob Honohan
 Rena Buckley
 Juliet Murphy
 Mary O'Connor

References

Outside Sources
 List of Cork Senior Football Champions
 List of Cork Intermediate Football Champions
 Hogan Stand list of Cork Champions
 Cork GAA results archive page
 Donoughmore GAA club website

Gaelic games clubs in County Cork
Gaelic football clubs in County Cork
Hurling clubs in County Cork